A Nefertiti piercing is a female genital piercing that is a combination of a vertical clitoral hood piercing and a Christina piercing. Healing can be lengthy given the amount of tissue the jewelry must pass through. Flexible bars are recommended by professional piercers because of the pressure that can be put on the piercing from passing through so much flesh.

References

Female genital piercings